Surajpur may refer to:

Surajpur, Budaun, a village in Ambiapur Block (district subdivision), Budaun district, Uttar Pradesh, India
Surajpur, Chhattisgarh, a town in central India
Surajpur district, a district in the Indian state of Chhattisgarh
Surajpur, Pakistan, a town in the Punjab province of Pakistan